The Kevin Hayes Stakes, registered as the Boronia Stakes, is a Melbourne Racing Club Group 3 Thoroughbred horse race, for three-year-old fillies, at set weights with penalties, over a distance of 1200 metres. It is held annually at Caulfield Racecourse in Melbourne, Australia in February. Total prize money for the race is A$200,000.

History
The race is named after the former Chairman of the Victoria Amateur Turf Club, Kevin Hayes.

Name
1984–1985 - Catanach's Handicap 
1986–1988 - Jewel Handicap 
1989 - Jewel Stakes
1990–1996 - Laurent Perrier Stakes
1997 - Inglis Prem Yearling Stakes
1998 - Swamp King Sand Park Stakes
1999–2002 - Sandown Park (UK) Stakes
2003 - Sandown Park (UK) Handicap
2004 onwards - Kevin Hayes Stakes

Distance
1984–1988 – 1400 metres
1989–1997 – 1200 metres 
1998–1999 – 1100 metres
2000 onward - 1200 metres

Grade
1984–2013 - Listed race
2014 onward - Group 3

Venue
 2006 - Sandown Racecourse
 2023 - Sandown Racecourse

Winners

2022 – Argentia 
2021 – La Mexicana 
2020 – How Womantic 
2019 – Crack The Code
2018 – Booker
2017 – Fuhryk
2016 - Risque  
2015 - Sabatini  
2014 - Spirits Dance   
2013 - Octavia 
2012 - Soft Sand 
2011 - Miss Gai Flyer
2010 - Set For Fame
2009 - Typhoon Tracy
2008 - Absolut Glam
2007 - Gina Lollawitcha
2006 - Chetwynd South
2005 - Hollow Bullet
2004 - French Bid
2003 - Brief Embrace    
2002 - Fair Embrace  
2001 - Queen Carey 
2000 - Heaps Of Fun  
1999 - Rainbow Bubbles 
1998 - Drop Anchor 
1997 - Chalee   
1996 - Rubidium   
1995 - Eccentricity  
1994 - Adagietto  
1993 - Crazy Neaux 
1992 - Rockabye   
1991 - Mahaasin   
1990 - Sister Canny  
1989 - Gilded Lily 
1988 - Golden Unicorn  
1987 - Fashion Fun 
1986 - Nancress   
1985 - Winged Keel 
1984 - Fork Tongue

See also
 List of Australian Group races
 Group races

References

Horse races in Australia